Solute carrier family 23 member 2 is a protein that in humans is encoded by the SLC23A2 gene.

The absorption of vitamin C into the body and its distribution to organs requires two sodium-dependent vitamin C transporters. This gene encodes one of the two required transporters and the encoded protein accounts for tissue-specific uptake of vitamin C. Previously, this gene had an official symbol of SLC23A1.

See also
 Solute carrier family

References

Further reading

Solute carrier family